Why Me & Sherry's House is a non-profit organization established in 1985, in the suburbs of Worcester, Massachusetts.  The home provides an environment for children who battle childhood cancer with the support of others encountering similar circumstances with the illness.

History
Why Me
Worcester Help for Youth, Memories Everlasting
The Why Me Organization was developed by Sherry Shepherd a thirteen-year-old cancer patient.  Sherry was the first patient in the opening of the oncology department at the University Of Massachusetts Medical Center in Worcester, Massachusetts.  Sherry wanted to leave her legacy to the community and help other cancer patients through their struggle and challenges of the disease.  Why Me, stands for Worcester Help for Youth, Memories Everlasting.

Sherry’s House
Sherry's House is an addition to the Why Me Organization.  Sherry's House provides a place for children and their families to receive compassion, encouragement and support throughout the battle of their illness of childhood cancer.  Sherry's House serves as the home base and services over 500 families from all over the New England area.  Summer Camp, monthly support group meetings, Easter Egg Hunt, and more are held at Sherry's House for all Why Me families. Sherry's House is also an eight bedroom residence for families to reside while on active treatment.  It is cost free to stay there.

Ben's Activity Center
Ben's Activity Center is a wing added to Sherry's House in honor of five-year-old Ben Hagan.  The 3,200 square foot area provides a three level living area for children and their families, consisting of a Main floor, Bedroom floor, and a Basement.  The Main floor provides a clubhouse environment for children to play, do activities, arts and crafts, and a large toy room.  The Basement is a play area consisting of air hockey and pool tables and video games. The top floor is a hospice suite for end of life care or for families after a transplant.  Within the suite is two bedrooms, full kitchen, laundry, and sitting room.

References

External links 
 http://www.whyme.org/sherrys-house.php

Organizations based in Worcester, Massachusetts
Non-profit organizations based in Massachusetts